Nationalist army may refer
 The Nationalist Army of Africa in Spain under Franco
 The National Revolutionary Army of the Republic of China
The Republic of China Armed Forces the armed forces of the Republic of China now on Taiwan.
 The Republic of Korea Armed Forces of South Korea

See also
國軍 (disambiguation) (in Chinese characters)